Fayyazi may refer to:
 Bita Fayyazi (b. 1962), Iranian artist
 Fayyazi, Iran, a village in Khuzestan Province, Iran